The High Commission of Saint Lucia in London is the diplomatic mission of Saint Lucia in the United Kingdom. It shares the building with the High Commission of Dominica.

The High Commission was used as a location in the 1989 film For Queen and Country starring Denzel Washington, although it is unclear whether it was filmed here.

Gallery

References

External links

 Official site

Saint Lucia
Diplomatic missions of Saint Lucia
Saint Lucia–United Kingdom relations
Buildings and structures in the Royal Borough of Kensington and Chelsea
South Kensington
Saint Lucia and the Commonwealth of Nations
United Kingdom and the Commonwealth of Nations